Gregory Leo O’Brien  (born 1961) is a New Zealand poet, painter and editor.

Life
Born in Matamata in 1961, O'Brien trained as a journalist in Auckland and worked as a newspaper reporter in Northland.  He graduated from the University of Auckland.

His work has appeared in Islands, Landfall, Sport, Meanjin and Scripsi.
He lives in Wellington.

Awards and honours
 1988 Sargeson Fellowship
 1995 Victoria University Writing Fellow
 1997 Landfall Essay Competition
 1997 Montana New Zealand Book Award for Poetry
 2005 LIANZA Elsie Locke Non-Fiction Award
 2008 Montana New Zealand Book Award for Reference and Anthology
 2012 Prime Minister's Awards for Literary Achievement

In the 2014 New Year Honours, O'Brien was appointed a Member of the New Zealand Order of Merit, for services to the arts.

Works
"Rocks, Te Namu Pa, Taranaki"; "Untitled"; "Beausoleil", "European", Shearsman 59
"Printmaking Studio of John Drawbridge, Island Bay, Wellington", Shearsman 67/68
"Wet Jacket Arm", Jacket 35, Early 2008
 Location of the Least Person (opening with the ‘Old Man South Road’ sequence), was published in Auckland in 1987
 Dunes and Barns (1988)
 Man with a Child’s Violin (1990)
 Great Lake (Sydney, 1991)
 Malachi, a charming verse novella (Adelaide, 1993)
 Days Beside Water, Auckland in 1993
 Winter I Was (Victoria University Press, 1999)
 Afternoon of an Evening Train (Victoria University Press, Wellington, 2005)

Novel
 Diesel Mystic (1989),

Anthologies

Criticism
 "Running Dog The Poetry of Ken Bolton", Sport 16: Autumn 1996
 After Bathing At Baxter's, Victoria University Press, 2002.
 News of the Swimmer Reaches Shore (Carcanet Press, Manchester, 2007)
 A Nest of Singing Birds: 100 Years of the New Zealand School Journal (Learning Media Ltd, Wellington, New Zealand, 2007)

Editor

References

External links
"Gregory O'Brien", Scottish Poetry Library
"O'Brien, Gregory ", Aotearoa New Zealand Poetry Sound Archive

1961 births
Living people
New Zealand journalists
20th-century New Zealand poets
20th-century New Zealand male writers
New Zealand male poets
University of Auckland alumni
People from Matamata
Members of the New Zealand Order of Merit